Breland may refer to:

Places
Breland, Norway, a village in Agder county, Norway
Breland Station, a railway station located within Breland, Norway

People
Breland (musician) (born 1995), an American singer, songwriter and record producer
Jessica Breland (born 1988), an American basketball player for the Chicago Sky WNBA team
Jim Breland (born 1944), a former American football player who was an All-American center for Georgia Tech 
Marian Breland Bailey (1920–2001), an American psychologist and applied behavior analyst
Mark Breland (born 1963), a former world champion boxer from New York
Pascal Breland, a famous 19th-century pre-confederation Canadian Métis farmer and politician
Patrice Breland (1837–1908), a fur trader and political figure in Manitoba, Canada

Other
Breland, a fictional place in Khorvaire in the Dungeons and Dragons universe